is a 2008 Japanese horror film directed by Yûichi Kanemaru and starring Chiharu Komatsu.

Plot

Cast  
 Chiharu Komatsu 
 Gô Ibuki 
 Ai Fukaya
 Ippei Kanie
 Mitsuki Koga

See also
 List of horror films of 2008

References

External links

2008 horror films
2008 films
Japanese horror films
2000s Japanese films